Zaine Pierre (born 21 September 1993) is a Saint Lucian international footballer who plays as a midfielder.

Club career
Born in Dennery, Pierre began his career with Vieux Fort and Square United. On 24 February 2010, he joined TT Pro League club W Connection. He made his debut for Trinidadian club W Connection on 20 September 2010. Earlier that month, Pierre had gone on trial with English team Stoke City. Pierre has also trialled with English clubs Arsenal, Tottenham Hotspur and Manchester City, and has attracted attention from a number of Spanish sides.

In August 2011, Pierre went on trial with Italian club Genoa, signing for them in April 2012. On 19 January 2014, Pierre was called up to the Genoa senior squad for the first time in a match against Inter Milan. He spent loan spells at Messina and Aversa Normanna, before returning to W Connection for the 2015–16 season.

International career
Pierre made his senior debut for Saint Lucia in 2010, and has played in FIFA World Cup qualifying matches for them.

International goals
Scores and results list Saint Lucia's goal tally first.

References

1993 births
Living people
People from Dennery Quarter
Saint Lucian footballers
Saint Lucia international footballers
Square United players
W Connection F.C. players
Genoa C.F.C. players
A.C.R. Messina players
S.F. Aversa Normanna players
TT Pro League players
Serie C players
Association football midfielders
Saint Lucian expatriate footballers
Saint Lucian expatriate sportspeople in Trinidad and Tobago
Expatriate footballers in Trinidad and Tobago
Saint Lucian expatriate sportspeople in Italy
Expatriate footballers in Italy
NK Novigrad players
Expatriate footballers in Croatia
Saint Lucia youth international footballers